Dilla is a town located in the western Awdal region of Somaliland. It lies between the city of Borama and Kalabaydh town. The town is presently part of Baki district.

Demographics
There is no census on the town population, but the district of Baki has a population of 96,885 people. Dilla is exclusively inhabited by the Mohamuud Nuur, one of the two sub divisions of Reer Nuur, a clan of the Makahiil Gadabuursi.

R.J Hayward and I.M. Lewis (2005) both state that Dilla is the major town and region of the Reer Mohamuud Nuur:
"The major town of the Rer Mohamoud Nur, Dila."

See also
Administrative divisions of Somaliland
Regions of Somaliland
Districts of Somaliland

References

External links
Dillapress 
Dilla, Somalia 

Populated places in Awdal